Altone D'Costa (born 1976/77), is an Indian politician and businessperson from Goa. He is the current member of Goa Legislative Assembly representing the Quepem Assembly constituency. D'Costa contested on Indian National Congress ticket in 2022 Goa Legislative Assembly election and emerged victorious. He defeated former Deputy Chief Minister and four term BJP MLA, Chandrakant Kavlekar by a margin of 3601 votes.

Early and personal life
Altone D'Costa was born to Cruzinho D'Costa in Goa. He completed his Secondary School Certificate from Perpetual Succour Convent High School, Navelim in 1992. D'Costa also has completed an electric and welding course from Agnel Trade School, Verna in 1995.

D'Costa is married to businesswoman, Valanki D'Costa. The couple own the La Grace Resort Chains in Goa. He currently resides in Quepem, Goa.

References

Living people
1970s births
Goa MLAs 2022–2027
Year of birth uncertain
Indian National Congress politicians from Goa
Businesspeople from Goa